Harold Barnes (born 22 July 1936) is an English politician who was the Labour Party Member of Parliament for North East Derbyshire from 1987 to 2005.

Life and career

Born in Easington, County Durham, Barnes was educated at Ruskin College in Oxford and the University of Hull. He was elected to Parliament in the 1987 election. Barnes stood down at the May 2005 general election, and was succeeded by Natascha Engel.

Political Positions

Barnes was considered to be on the left of the party, and as a member of the Socialist Campaign Group (SCG) he voted against Tony Blair's leadership on a number of issues. However, unlike other members of the SCG he was not an advocate of the Troops out movement (from Northern Ireland). When the group split over NATO intervention in Kosovo in 1999, he supported intervention, which was the position of the government.

Before entering parliament, Barnes was a member of the Independent Labour Party's successor organisation, Independent Labour Publications. As an MP, he joined a supporters group, Friends of the ILP.

References

External links 
 
Three Score Years And Ten (Personal blog since Barnes' 70th birthday)

1936 births
Living people
European democratic socialists
Members of the Parliament of the United Kingdom for constituencies in Derbyshire
Independent Labour Party MPs
Labour Party (UK) MPs for English constituencies
People from Easington, County Durham
UK MPs 1987–1992
UK MPs 1992–1997
UK MPs 1997–2001
UK MPs 2001–2005